Incheon International Airport  (sometimes referred to as Seoul–Incheon International Airport) is the largest airport in South Korea. It is the primary airport serving the Seoul Capital Area and one of the largest and busiest airports in the world.

As of 2021, the airport has been rated by Skytrax as the fourth best airport in the world. Skytrax also has rated the airport as the world's best international transit airport and one of the world's cleanest airports. The airport is one of Skytrax's 5-star airports and also has been awarded for the best airport security in 2021.

During the entire run of the best airport worldwide ranking by Airports Council International (ACI) from 2005 to 2011, Incheon International Airport topped the ranking every year. ACI also rated the airport as the best airport in Asia-Pacific for 10 consecutive years from 2006 to 2016 until the ranking series ended in 2017.
 	
The airport has a golf course, spa, private sleeping rooms, an ice skating rink, a casino, indoor gardens, video game center and a Museum of Korean Culture. The airport's average departure and arrival take 19 minutes and 12 minutes respectively, as compared to worldwide average of 60 minutes and 45 minutes, ranking it among the fastest airports in the world for customs processing. Its duty-free shopping mall has been rated the world's best for three years in a row in 2013 by Business Traveller. Incheon International Airport also reports a 0.0001% baggage mishandling rate.

The airport opened for business on 29 March 2001 to replace the older Gimpo International Airport, which now serves mostly domestic destinations and shuttle flights to several East Asian metropolitan areas to Beijing Capital, Osaka Kansai, Shanghai Hongqiao, Taipei Songshan and Tokyo Haneda.

Incheon International Airport is located west of Incheon's city center, on an artificially created piece of land between Yeongjong and Yongyu Islands. The two islands were originally separated by shallow sea. That area between the two islands was reclaimed for the construction project, effectively connecting the once separate Yeongjong and Yongyu islands. The reclaimed area as well as the two islands are all part of Jung-gu, an administrative district of Incheon.

Incheon International Airport's terminal has 111 boarding gates altogether, with 44 in Terminal 1, 30 in Concourse A (connected to terminal 1), and 37 in Terminal 2.

The airport was constructed to share the demand for air transport in the 21st century and to serve as a hub airport in Northeast Asia.

Incheon International Airport was named the winner of World's Best Transit Airport in 2020. Terminal 2 at Incheon International Airport was named World's Best Airport Terminal in 2020.

History

After the 1988 Summer Olympics, international air traffic to Korea increased. In the 1990s, it became apparent that Gimpo International Airport could not cope with the increase in air traffic. To reduce the load on Gimpo International Airport, the government decided to build a new international airport.

The new airport was originally planned to be located in Cheongju, 124 km southeast from Seoul, but due to its distance, it was opposed by Seoul and Gyeonggi citizens.  Hwaseong was the other choice, but it was also rejected due to similar reasons. Finally the area chosen was Incheon. 

In November 1992, the construction of the Incheon airport began on reclaimed land between Yeongjong Island and Youngyu Island, and took eight years to finish, with an additional six months for testing. Completion was initially scheduled for 1997 but delayed due to the economic crisis. The airport was officially opened on 21 March 2001.

On 15 November 2006, the Airbus A380 landed at the airport as part of the first leg of its certification trip. Tests on the runways, taxiways, and ramps showed that the airport could handle the aircraft.

To further upgrade service, Incheon and major Korean logistics firm Hanjin Group (parent company of Korean Air) agreed on 10 January 2008 to build Yeongjong Medical Centre, which was completed in 2012. This hospital serves nearby residents and some of the 30,000 medical tourists who come to Korea annually.

Statistics

The airport serves as a hub for international civilian air transportation and cargo traffic in East Asia. In 2016, the Incheon International Airport was the fifth busiest airport in the world and third in Asia by cargo traffic, and 19th in the world and eighth in Asia by passenger traffic. In 2016, the airport served a total of 57,849,814 passengers.

The airport opened for business in early 2001 to replace the older Gimpo International Airport, which now serves mostly domestic destinations plus shuttle flights to  Beijing Capital, Osaka Kansai, Shanghai Hongqiao, Taipei Songshan and Tokyo Haneda although flights to Beijing and Osaka also operate from Incheon Airport.

Construction phases
The airport was originally planned to be built in three phases, incrementally increasing airport capacity as the demand grew. This was changed, however, to four phases after the airport was opened.

Phase 1

In Phase 1, the airport had a capacity of 30 million passengers annually, and a cargo capacity of 1.7 million metric tonnes annually.

Phase 2
Phase 2 construction began in 2002, and was originally expected to be completed in December 2008. However, in an attempt to have the airport ready for the 2008 Beijing Olympics, which took place in August 2008, the schedule was modified, and Phase 2 construction was completed on 20 June 2008. During this construction phase, a third parallel  runway and a 13-hectare cargo terminal area were added. A 16.5-hectare concourse connected to the main passenger building via two parallel  underground passageways was added, with a Mitsubishi Crystal Mover shuttle train APM shuttling passengers between the concourse and the main terminal.

Many long-distance foreign carriers were moved to the new concourse, with Korean Air and Asiana Airlines continuing to use the existing terminal.

Phase 3
The South Korean government invested ₩4 trillion until 2017 to expand Incheon International Airport. The second passenger terminal was constructed in the northern field of the airport, and its existing cargo terminal and other infrastructures were expanded. The terminals are connected to each other by the underground "Starline" train. Also, a Landside Connecting system (Bus shuttle) is used for airport employees and departing passengers who don't come to the right terminal. After completion, Incheon International Airport is able to handle 62 million passengers and 5.8 million tons of cargo a year, up from the previous capacity of 44 million passengers and 4.5 million tons. Construction began in 2011 and was completed in 2017. The terminal opened on 18 January 2018. The airport also signed an agreement to build a resort called "Inspire" which includes 6-star hotels, theme parks, and a casino.

Phase 4
Between 2017 and 2024, a fourth construction phase at the airport is taking place. There will be an expansion of Terminal 2, the building of a fourth runway and additional apron and car parking facilities. Following completion of the works, it is expected that the hourly flight capacity of the airport will increase from 90 to 107.

There are long-term plans for a fifth runway and third terminal.

Terminals

Terminal 1
Terminal 1 (measuring 496,000 square meters) is the largest airport terminal in area in South Korea. Terminal 1 was designed by Curtis W. Fentress, FAIA, RIBA of Fentress Architects. Its construction cost was 1.3816 trillion South Korean Won. The terminal has 44 boarding ports (all of which can accommodate the Airbus A380), 50 customs inspection ports, 2 biological quarantine counters, 6 stationary and 14 portable passenger quarantine counters, 120 arrival passport inspection counters, 8 arrival security ports, 28 departure security ports, 252 check in counters, and 120 departure passport inspection counters. In 2015, an automatic check-in counter lane was introduced, where people traveling via Korean Air, Asiana Airlines and China Southern Airlines can use. Instead of having airport staff at the counter, there is a machine where travelers input their flight information, scan their passports, receive their flight tickets and lastly, load the luggage onto the conveyor. This system was planned to be introduced in Terminal 2, but in May 2015 Incheon Airport used one of the counter islands for the unmanned luggage handling system.

Midfield Concourse

The passenger concourse was completed at the end of May 2008. It is connected to Terminal 1 by two parallel  underground passageways equipped with IATs (Intra Airport Transit). It has 30 gates and six lounges (Asiana Airlines/Star Alliance, Singapore Airlines/Star Alliance, Japan Airlines/Oneworld, Korean Air/SkyTeam, and China Eastern Airlines/SkyTeam).

Terminal 2
A new passenger terminal opened on 18 January 2018, and Korean Air, KLM, Delta Air Lines, and Air France flights were relocated from Terminal 1 to Terminal 2. Other SkyTeam members such as Aeromexico, China Airlines, Garuda Indonesia, XiamenAir, Czech Airlines and Aeroflot started serving the Terminal 2 on 28 October 2018. The rest of the SkyTeam members, such as Vietnam Airlines, China Eastern Airlines and Shanghai Airlines, will be relocated to Terminal 2 after the Phase 4 construction work is completed.

Airlines and destinations

Passenger

Cargo

Accolades
Incheon International airport has been the recipient of a number of awards since its opening, including:
 Best Airport Worldwide at the first Airport Service Quality Awards in 2007.
 Won the GT Tested Award for Best Airport in the World in January 2007.
 Named by Global Traveler (GT) as the Best Airport in the World for the second straight year in January 2008.
 Named World's Best Airport for 2009, in the World Airport Survey results published by Skytrax. 
 In 2012 it was ranked the best airport in the world by Skytrax.
In 2018, Incheon International Airport won the Asian Big Airport of the Year award.

Accidents and incidents
On 16 June 2011, Airbus A321-200 Flight 324 operated by Asiana Airlines HL7763 between Chengdu Shuangliu International Airport, China and Incheon International Airport was fired upon by two soldiers of the Republic of Korea Marine Corps as it came in to land at Incheon. A total of 99 rounds were discharged at the aircraft, which was out of range and made a safe landing without sustaining any damage. The soldiers had misidentified the aircraft as belonging to the North Korean military, and were acting on orders that gave them permission to engage without reference to senior officers, following the Bombardment of Yeonpyeong in November 2010.

Ground transport

Public transport

Bus
Airport shuttle buses transport passengers between Terminal 1 and Terminal 2. Buses are free, arrive every 5 to 8 minutes, take approximately 20 minutes travel time, and stop at the Hyatt Hotel or airport fire station in route, depending on direction.

Airport buses are called limousine buses. Standard limousine buses travel to Gimpo Airport & Songjeong station.

Intercity buses connect with other towns and cities in Korea.

The Korea City Air Terminal in Gangnam is linked with the airport through limousine buses.

Rail
The Airport Railroad Express (AREX and styled as A'REX) has a station located in the Transport Centre adjacent to the Terminal 1 building and is in the basement of Terminal 2. It provides service to Gimpo International Airport and Seoul. Many of the stations along the line provide connections to Incheon Subway, Seoul Metropolitan Subway, and Incheon Airport Maglev.

For departing passengers, Seoul Station City Airport Terminal has check-in and immigration facilities before arrival at the airport.

The Korea Train eXpress (KTX) operated at the same station as AREX but used a different platform. It operated 20 times per day from the airport; twelve times on the Gyeonbu Line, twice on the Gyeonjeon Line, four times on the Honam Line, and twice on the Jeolla Line. The service started in 2014 but was suspended in March 2018 due to low ridership. The suspension became permanent in September 2018 as the line was officially closed.

The Incheon Airport Maglev opened in February 2016. The first phase is 6.1 km long, spread over six stations, taking riders from the airport toward the south-west of the island where a water park is located. Phase 2 will be 9.7 km long, extending the line to the north-west of the island. Phase 3 will add 37.4 km, transforming the line into a circle.

Ferry
A ferry service connects Yeongjong-do to the mainland. However, the dock is located a considerable distance from the airport. An alternative means of transport must be sought upon arriving at the island to be able to get to the airport.

Car
The airport provides a short term parking lot for 4,000 cars and a long-term parking lot for 6,000 cars. Shuttle services connect the long-term parking lot to the passenger terminal and the cargo terminal. Car rental is located near the long-term parking lot. A link to the mainland is provided by the toll Yeongjong Bridge and an expressway. A second expressway on the Incheon Bridge also connects the island but to central Incheon. The 3rd Landing Bridge that links Yeongjongdo to Cheongna International City is being built now. (Opens in 2025)

Traffic and statistics

In 2017, the airport was the world's fourth busiest airport by cargo traffic and third in Asia, and the world's 19th busiest airport by passenger traffic and ninth in Asia. In 2019, the airport served a total of 70,857,908 passengers.

Top destinations 

Domestic destinations are shown below:

Annual traffic

Top carriers

In 2018, the twelve carriers with the largest percentage of passengers flying into, out of, or through Incheon are as follows:

See also

Transport in South Korea
 List of airports in South Korea
 Busiest airports in South Korea by passenger traffic

References

External links 

 
 Official Site of Korea Tourism Org.: Incheon

 
Airports in South Korea
Airports established in 2001
Buildings and structures in Incheon
Transport in Incheon
Transport in Seoul
Jung District, Incheon
2001 establishments in South Korea